A University at Buffalo Libraries Special Collection, The Poetry Collection at the University at Buffalo, The State University of New York, is devoted to 20th century poetry in English and English translation. Founded by Charles David Abbott, the University at Buffalo's first Director of Libraries, The Poetry Collection contains over 100,000 volumes by every major and many minor poet writing in English. Recordings of poets reading from their own works, poets' notebooks, letters and manuscripts, and a wide variety of literary magazines are also included in this collection. Approximately 5,000 little magazine titles, 1,200 current subscriptions, and a number of portraits, sculptures, and photographs round out the collection. Also included in the Poetry Collection is the James Joyce Archive, the world's largest collection of James Joyce manuscripts, books and artifacts.

External links
The Poetry Collection
The James Joyce Archive
University at Buffalo Libraries

University at Buffalo
Literary archives in the United States